The Committee for Employment and Learning was a Northern Ireland Assembly committee established to advise, assist and scrutinise the work of the Department for Employment and Learning and Minister of Employment and Learning. The committee also played a key role in the consultation, consideration and development of new legislation.

The committee was abolished in 2016 because the Department of Employment and Learning was closed and its mandate was transferred to other departments.

Membership 
Membership before the closure of the Department of Employment and Learning:

See also 
 Committee

References

External links 
 Committee for Employment and Learning

Northern Ireland Assembly